Something to Say may refer to:
 Something to Say (Richie Kotzen album), released in 1997
 Something to Say (Joey Pearson album), released in 2002
 Something to Say (Matthew West album), released in 2008
 "Something to Say", song by Joe Cocker from his 1972 self-titled album 
 "Something to Say", song by The Connells from their 1989 album Fun & Games
 "Something to Say", song by Harem Scarem from their 1991 self-titled debut album